Jordan Anthony John Evans (born 23 September 1995) is a Welsh semi-professional footballer who plays as a midfielder for Whitchurch Alport.

Career

Fulham
Evans came through Wrexham's academy from the age of 10 before joining Fulham aged 15. Evans signed a one-year contract extension with Fulham in July 2015, keeping him at Fulham until 2016. On 22 September 2015, Evans was an unused substitute for the League Cup game against Stoke City at Craven Cottage.

Evans was released by Fulham at the end of the 2015–16 season.

Oxford United (loan)
In November 2015, Evans joined League Two club Oxford United on loan until 17 January 2016. He made his first senior appearance as a second-half substitute on 6 December 2015 in an FA cup tie against Forest Green Rovers. His first senior start followed in the Football League Trophy against Yeovil Town on 8 December; Evans scored his first senior goal after just five minutes, an "unstoppable shot" from distance. He went on to make his first Football League appearance on 12 December 2015 against Carlisle United, coming on as a second-half substitute at the Kassam Stadium.

Return to Wrexham
In July 2016, Evans re-joined his former youth team Wrexham on trial, this time hoping to earn a first team contract. His trial was successful, and he signed a six-month contract with the club on 29 July 2016. He made his debut for the club on the opening day of the 2016–17 season, in a 0–0 draw with Dover Athletic. On 6 January 2017, Evans left Wrexham after his contract with the club expired. Wrexham manager Dean Keates had offered Evans a new 18-month deal with the club but the contract offer was rejected by Evans.

Bala Town
On 17 February 2017, Evans signed for Welsh Premier League side Bala Town.

Career statistics

Honours
Bala Town

Welsh Cup winner: 2017

References

External links
Jordan Evans profile at the official Wrexham A.F.C. website

1995 births
Living people
Footballers from Wrexham
Welsh footballers
Wales youth international footballers
Wales under-21 international footballers
Association football defenders
Wrexham A.F.C. players
Fulham F.C. players
Oxford United F.C. players
Bala Town F.C. players
English Football League players
National League (English football) players
Cymru Premier players
Cefn Druids A.F.C. players
Airbus UK Broughton F.C. players
Newtown A.F.C. players